Hugoton Municipal Airport  is a county-owned public-use airport located two nautical miles (3.7 km) southwest of the central business district of Hugoton, a city in Stevens County, Kansas, United States.

Although most U.S. airports use the same three-letter location identifier for the FAA and IATA, this airport is assigned HQG by the FAA but has no designation from the IATA.

Facilities and aircraft 
It has two runways: 2/20 is 5,000 by 75 feet (1,524 x 23 m) with a concrete surface; 13/31 is 2,627 by 60 feet (801 x 18 m) with an asphalt surface.

For the 12-month period ending August 22, 2007, the airport had 10,000 general aviation aircraft operations, an average of 27 per day. At that time there were 18 aircraft based at this airport: 83% single-engine, 11% multi-engine, and 6% ultralight.

Incidents and accidents
In 1952, a Braniff Airways Douglas DC-4 with an uncontrollable engine fire made a successful emergency landing at Hugoton Municipal Airport. Minor injuries were reported among the 45 passengers and three crew members. The DC-4 was destroyed by fire after the successful landing. Captain Stanford was praised for his quick actions and judgement.

References

External links 
 Aerial photo as of 26 March 2002 from USGS The National Map
 
 

Airports in Kansas
Buildings and structures in Stevens County, Kansas